Leptadrillia cinereopellis is a species of sea snail, a marine gastropod mollusk in the family Drilliidae.

Description
The length of the shell varies between 23 mm and 30 mm.

Distribution
This species occurs in the demersal zone of the Northwest Pacific Ocean off Japan and the South China Sea.

References

  Tucker, J.K. 2004 Catalog of recent and fossil turrids (Mollusca: Gastropoda). Zootaxa 682:1–1295

External links
 

cinereopellis
Gastropods described in 1971